The Diocese of Youngstown is a Latin Church ecclesiastical territory, or diocese, of the Catholic Church in northeastern Ohio in the United States.

The Diocese of Youngstown consists of seven counties: Mahoning, Trumbull, Columbiana, Stark, Portage, and Ashtabula. The Diocese of Youngstown is a suffragan diocese in the ecclesiastical province of the metropolitan Archdiocese of Cincinnati.

History

1700 to 1850 
During the 17th century, present day Ohio was part of the French colony of New France. The Diocese of Quebec, had jurisdiction over the region. In 1763, Ohio Country became part of the British Province of Quebec, forbidden from settlement by American colonists. After the American Revolution, the Ohio area became part of the new United States.  For Catholics, Ohio was now under the jurisdiction of the Archdiocese of Baltimore, which then comprised the entire country.

In 1808, Pope Pius VII erected the Diocese of Bardstown in Kentucky, with jurisdiction over the new state of Ohio along with the other midwest states. Pope Pius VII on June 19, 1821, erected the Diocese of Cincinnati, taking the entire state of Ohio from the Diocese of Bardstown.Pope Pius IX erected the Diocese of Cleveland on April 23, 1847, with territory taken from the Archdiocese of Cincinnati. At that point, the diocese included the counties around Youngstown, Ohio.

1850 to 1900 
One of the earliest Roman Catholic communities in eastern Ohio was in Ashtabula.  In 1850, a small group of Catholics there petitioned the Diocese of Cleveland for their own parish. However, the diocese denied the request due to a shortage of clergy.  Instead, a visiting priest from Painesville, Ohio, would intermittently undertake an  day's journey by horse to Ashtabula over secondary rural roads.  

In 1858, the diocese established the St. Joseph Mission in Ashtabula and assigned Father Charles Coquelle as its resident priest. The inaugural members of St. Joseph Parish were primarily Irish and German immigrants, drawn to Ashtabula by the railroad industry.  Initial services were celebrated in private homes until 1860, when parishioners constructed a small wooden frame church.  The purchase of an additional five acres in 1877 allowed construction of St. Joseph's two-story brick secondary school, staffed by the Sisters of the Humility of Mary.

In 1878, a group of Catholics began celebrating mass in a grocery store adjacent to Ashtabula Harbor.  Mother of Sorrows Parish was established there in 1890 and a permanent church was constructed in 1898.

1900 to 1950 
Towards the turn of the century, a large influx of Italian American Catholics made the formation of a third church in Ashtabula desirable.  In 1897, parishioners purchased land on the southwest corner of Columbus Avenue and Sibley Street and in 1902 began construction of Our Lady of Mount Carmel Church.  The first mass in the new church  was celebrated in 1903. As the Catholic presence grew in Ashtabula, parishioners started building a large masonry building to replace the original St. Joseph's Church on Aug. 1, 1905.  That church cost $34,000 to build..

Another early settlement of Catholics in the Diocese of Youngstown was in Dungannon, Ohio.The mission was first settled on St. Paul's Street. The original log cabin is still standing today. 

Pope Pius XII erected the Diocese of Youngstown with territory from  Diocese of Cleveland in 1943. The new diocese included the counties of Ashtabula, Columbiana, Mahoning, Portage, Stark, and Trumbull. The pope named Auxiliary Bishop James A. McFadden of the Diocese of Cleveland as the first bishop of Youngstown. St. Columba Church in Youngstown became the cathedral for the diocese. 

The Diocese of Youngstown covered  with 110 parishes, three Catholic-run hospitals, 54 elementary schools, one junior high school, and three Catholic high schools.

1950 to 2000 
In 1949, Pope Pius XII appointed Bishop Emmet M. Walsh of the Diocese of Charleston as a coadjutor bishop to assist McFadden.  After Bishop McFadden died on November 16, 1952, Walsh succeeded automatically succeeded him as bishop.  In 1954, St. Columba Cathedral was destroyed by a fire and Walsh started building a new cathedral. St. Patrick Church in Youngstown served as the pro-cathedral until the new St. Columba's was dedicated in 1958. In 1960, Pope John XXIII named Reverend James Malone as an auxiliary bishop for the Diocese of Youngstown.  After  Walsh died on March 16, 1968, Pope Paul VI appointed Malone as bishop on May 2, 1968.

After the closing of Youngstown Sheet and Tube in 1977, 5,000 people in the Youngstown area lost their jobs.  Malone led an unsuccessful effort by clergy from different faiths to stop it.A strong advocate of interfaith communication, Malone was elected as the first Catholic leader of the Ohio Council of Churches.  He delivered sermons in Protestant churches and urged his priests to establish contacts with non-Catholic congregations.  Malone retired in 1996 after 28 years as bishop of Youngstown. Pope John Paul II appointed Auxiliary Bishop Bishop Thomas J. Tobin from the Diocese of Pittsburgh as the fourth bishop of Youngstown in 1996.

2000 to present 
On March 31, 2005, John Paul II appointed Tobin as bishop of the Diocese of Providence. The post of bishop remained vacant for almost two years, with Monsignor Robert J. Siffrin serving as diocesan administrator. On January 30, 2007, Pope Benedict XVI named Bishop George Murry of the Diocese of St. Thomas as the fifth bishop of the Diocese of Youngstown.On May 28, 2010, Murry announced the reconfiguration of parishes in the diocese to reduce their total number to 87.

In May 2020, Murry died of leukemia. Siffrin served again as diocesan administrator from June 6, 2020 to January 12, 2021. During the absence of a bishop, Bishop Emeritus Martin J. Amos of the Diocese of Davenport performed ordinations for the diocese. In November 2020, Pope Francis named Reverend David J. Bonnar of the Diocese of Pittsburgh as the sixth bishop of Youngstown. Bonnar is the current bishop of Youngstown.

From 2000 to 2018 in the diocese, baptisms fell by 69%, weddings by 62%, first communions by 61%, and funerals by 25%. The numbers of Catholics in the six counties of the diocese fell by 36%, compared with a total population decrease of 4.3%.

Statistics 
As of 2020, the Diocese of Youngstown contained 86 parishes with 103 diocesan priests, 13 religious priests, 84 permanent deacons, 26 male religious, and 175 female religious. It had a Catholic population of 163,650 (13.9% of the total population) in an area totaling . As of 2021, the diocese had 15 seminarians studying at the Pontifical College Josephinum in Columbus, Ohio, St. Vincent Seminary in Latrobe, Pennsylvania, and St. Mary Seminary in Wickliffe, Ohio.

Bishops

Bishops of Youngstown
 James A. McFadden (1943–1952)
 Emmet M. Walsh (1952–1968; Coadjutor 1949–1952)
 James W. Malone (1968–1995)
 Thomas J. Tobin (1995–2005), appointed Bishop of Providence
 George V. Murry (2007–2020)
 David Bonnar (2021–present)

Former auxiliary bishops of Youngstown
James W. Malone (1960–1968), appointed Bishop of Youngstown
William A. Hughes (1974–1979), appointed Bishop of Covington
Benedict C. Franzetta (1980–1996)

Education

Preschools and elementary/middle schools
The Diocese of Youngstown operates the following elementary/middle schools (Grades PreK-8 unless otherwise noted):

Most of the elementary/middle schools within Mahoning County, plus one school within Trumbull County, are part of a singular system named Lumen Christi Catholic Schools. The Academy is composed of 8 campuses:

 Early Childhood Learning Center at Holy Family, Poland (PreK-K)
 Early Childhood Learning Center at St. Christine, Youngstown (PreK-K)
 Early Childhood Learning Center at St. Joseph, Austintown (PreK-K)
 Early Childhood Learning Center at St. Luke, Boardman (PreK-K)
 Holy Family School, Poland
 Saint Charles School, Boardman
 Saint Christine School, Youngstown
 Saint Nicholas School, Struthers
 Saint Rose School, Girard
Most of the elementary/middle schools within Stark County are part of a singular system named Holy Cross Academy. The Academy is composed of 10 campuses:

 Our Lady of Peace, Canton (PreK-5th.)
 Regina Coeli-St. Joseph, Alliance (PreK-5th.)
 Saint Barbara, Massillon (PreK-7th.; PreK-8th. starting with the 2017–2018 school year)
 Saint Joan of Arc, Canton
 Saint Louis, Louisville (PreK-5th.) (closing at the end of the 2018–2019 school year)
 Saint Mary, Massillon 
 Saint Michael the Archangel, Canton
 Saint Paul, North Canton
 Saint Peter, Canton (PreK-5th.)
 Saints Philip and James, Canal Fulton

In 2013, as part of the Academy's "Transition for Growth" plan, the Diocese of Youngstown announced that St. Joseph Canton would close after the 2013 to 2014 school year, and Saint Peter and Saint Louis would become "Family Preschool Centers" only. The three schools conducted an appeal process in order to keep them open as PreK-8 schools. On February 27, 2014, the diocese announced the results of the appeal. Within the report, it was announced that the St. Joseph Canton campus would still close at the end of the 2013 to2014 school year. For the 2014 to 2015 school year, the St. Peter and St. Louis campuses would remain open, but serve only grades PreK-5th. The Regina Coeli/St. Joseph and Our Lady of Peace campuses would also serve only grades PreK through 5. The 6-8th grade students within the diocese would be served by a new middle school operating on the campus of St. Thomas Aquinas High School.

The following preschools and elementary/middle schools operate independently of a regional system:

Ashtabula County (1):

 Saint John School, Ashtabula (K-12)

Columbiana County (1):

 Saint Paul School, Salem

Mahoning County (2):

 Saint Joseph the Provider School, Youngstown
 Ursuline Preschool and Kindergarten, Youngstown

Portage County (2):

 Saint Joseph School, Randolph
 Saint Patrick School, Kent

Stark County (2):

 Saint James School, Waynesburg (PreK-6)
 St. Thomas Aquinas Middle School, Louisville (Grades 6-8)

Trumbull County (3):

 John F. Kennedy Catholic School, Warren (Lower Campus: PreK-5) (Upper Campus: 6-12) (Note: The Lower Campus was formerly named Notre Dame School: Blessed Sacrament Campus, up until the 2010–2011 school year)
 Saint Rose School, Girard
 Villa Maria Teresa Preschool and Kindergarten, Hubbard (PreK-K)

Former preschools and elementary/middle schools

 Assumption School, Geneva (Closed after the 2014–2015 school year)
 Byzantine Catholic Central School, Youngstown (Closed after the 2008–2009 school year)
 Holy Cross Academy at Saint Joseph Canton Campus, Canton (Closed after the 2013–2014 school year)
 Holy Trinity School (Struthers, Ohio/Mahoning (Closed after 1991–1992 school year)
 Immaculate Conception School, Ravenna (Closed after the 2003–2004 school year)
 Mother of Sorrows School, Ashtabula (Closed and Merged with St. John School)
 Notre Dame School, Saint Pius X Campus, Warren (Closed after the 2009–2010 school year)
 Our Lady of Mount Carmel School, Ashtabula (Closed and Merged with St. John School)
 Sacred Heart of Mary School, Harrisburg/Louisville (Closed after the 2008–2009 school year)
 Saint Aloysius School, East Liverpool (Closed after the 2014–2015 school year)
 Saint Anthony School, Canton (Opened 1927, closed 1980s)
 Saint Clement School, Navarre (Closed after the 2007–2008 school year)
 Saint Frances Cabrini School, Conneaut (Closed after the 2001–2002 school year)
Saint John the Baptist School, Canton (closed after 1981–1982 school year)
Saint Joseph and Immaculate Heart of Mary School, Austintown (Closed after the 2013–2014 school year. An Early Childhood Learning Center remains at St. Joseph.)
 St. Joseph School, Ashtabula (Closed 1980s) 
 Saint Joseph Mantua School, Mantua (Closed after the 2009–2010 school year)
 Saint Mary's of the Immaculate Conception School, Canton (Closed after the 1984–1985 school year)
 Saint Matthias School, Youngstown (Closed after the 2005–2006 school year)
 Saint Mary School, Conneaut (Closed after the 1971–1972 school year, merged with St. Frances Cabrini School)
 Saints Mary and Joseph School, Newton Falls (Closed after the 2010–2011 school year)
 Saint Patrick School, Hubbard (Closed after the 2015–2016 school year)

High schools
 Cardinal Mooney High School, Youngstown
 Central Catholic High School, Canton
 John F. Kennedy High School (Upper Campus), Warren
 St. Thomas Aquinas High School, Louisville
 Saint John High School*, Ashtabula
 Ursuline High School, Youngstown
 * Independently operated with the approval of the diocese

Higher education
 Walsh University, North Canton

Campus ministry
 Kent State University Parish Newman Center, Kent
 Youngstown State University Newman Center, Youngstown

Catholic radio serving the Diocese
WILB The Living Bread Radio Network

Print media 
The Diocese of Youngstown for 78 years published a print newspaper called The Catholic Exponent. The first issue was printed on January 7, 1944. However, it was announced in the Nov. 11, 2022 issue that the paper will cease and starting in February 2023 be replaced by a magazine published 10 times a year called The Catholic Echo.

References

External links
Official Website
Vocations website
Faith and Family Festival website

 
1943 establishments in Ohio
Christian organizations established in 1943
Youngstown
Youngstown
Youngstown
Youngstown, Ohio